Battle of Hill 60 is a name shared by two battles of World War I:

 Battle of Hill 60 (Western Front) (April 17–April 22, 1915), a subsidiary battle to the Battle of Neuve Chapelle
 Battle of Hill 60 (Gallipoli) (August 21–August 29, 1915), the last major assault of the Battle of Gallipoli

See also
 Hill 60 (disambiguation)